Beragala is a small town in Sri Lanka. It is located in Badulla District of Uva Province, Sri Lanka. The area is known for its natural environment, as well as for landslides.

Attractions

 Diyaluma Falls Koslanda
 Bambarakanda Falls
 Koslanda Falls

Transport
A4 Highway, Colombo-Ratnapua-Balangoda-Beragala-Koslanda-Wellawaya-Pottuvil-Batticaloa (Route 99)
A16 Road, Beragala-Hali-ela

See also
Towns in Uva

References

External links
Danger in the hills

Towns in Badulla District